Acanthochlamys is a genus of herbaceous plants  described as a genus in 1980. It has long been included in the Amaryllidaceae, but more recent systems place it in the Velloziaceae. Kao in 1989 placed in its own family, the Acanthochlamydaceae.

There is only one known species, Acanthochlamys bracteata, native to Tibet and Sichuan.

References 

Velloziaceae
Endemic flora of China
Monotypic Pandanales genera